Chongqing Airlines is an airline based in Chongqing, China. It operates both domestic passenger services within mainland China and international passenger services to Sri Lanka, Thailand, Vietnam and Singapore.

Chongqing Airlines had 402 employees in 2008.

History
Chongqing Airlines is jointly owned by China Southern Airlines (60%) and Chongqing Municipal Development & Investment Company (40%). The airline was established on 16 June 2007, and received its operating licence from the Civil Aviation Administration of China on 4 July 2007.

Chongqing Airlines launched its first flight from Chongqing to Shanghai Pudong International Airport on 8 July 2007.

Destinations
Chongqing Airlines served the following destinations in January 2016:

Fleet

, the Chongqing Airlines fleet consists of the following aircraft:

Historical fleet

One of the airline's first aircraft, an Airbus A320 named “The return of Hong Kong” (Registration B-2345) was stored in Guangzhou. It was temporarily returned to service before being stripped for parts.

References

External links

 Chongqing Airlines official website 

Chinese companies established in 2007
Airlines established in 2007
Airlines of China
Companies based in Chongqing
Transport in Chongqing
China Southern Airlines
Chinese brands